Bhongolwethu Makaleni (born 5 February 1994) is a South African cricketer. He made his List A debut on 1 March 2021, for Border in the 2020–21 CSA Provincial One-Day Challenge.

References

External links
 

1994 births
Living people
South African cricketers
Border cricketers
Place of birth missing (living people)